The 1995–96 Arizona Wildcats men's basketball team represented the University of Arizona. The team's head coach was Lute Olson. The team played its home games in McKale Center as members of the Pacific-10 Conference.

After going 13–5 to finish second in the Pac-10 regular-season, the team was seeded third in the West region of the NCAA tournament.  They advanced to the Sweet Sixteen before falling to #4 Kansas 83–80 in the regional semifinal.  The team finished with a record of 26–7.

Roster

Schedule and results

|-
!colspan=9| Regular season

|-
!colspan=9| NCAA tournament

Rankings

Team players drafted into the NBA

References

Arizona
Arizona
Arizona Wildcats men's basketball seasons
Arizona Wildcats
Arizona Wildcats